The 2016–17 Slovenian Third League began on 20 August 2016 and ended on 28 May 2017.

Competition format and rules
The 2016–17 Slovenian Third League was divided into four regional groups with a total of 52 participating clubs. Three groups (i.e. North, Centre, East) were composed of 14 clubs, while the West group had only 10 clubs participating in the competition.

On 29 June 2016, the Football Association of Slovenia decided to expand the Slovenian Second League in the 2017–18 season from 10 teams to 16 teams, meaning that in the 2016–17 Slovenian Third League season the top two teams from each group got promoted to the Second League. Also, unlike previous seasons, reserve teams were now able to earn a promotion to the Second League.

The number of relegated teams from each group was determined by the number of regional MNZ's from which the clubs in all four groups were part of. There were nine MNZ's governing bodies in Slovenian football:

MNZ Celje (North)
MNZ Maribor (North)
MNZ Ptuj (North)

MNZG-Kranj (Centre)
MNZ Ljubljana (Centre)

MNZ Lendava (East)
MNZ Murska Sobota (East)

MNZ Koper (West)
MNZ Nova Gorica (West)

This meant that three teams from 3. SNL North were relegated at the end of the season and replaced by the winners of the fourth tier competitions held separately in MNZ Celje, MNZ Maribor and MNZ Ptuj. The number of relegated teams from 3. SNL Centre and 3. SNL East was two, while only the bottom team was relegated from 3. SNL West as MNZ Koper and MNZ Nova Gorica managed a combined fourth tier competition. 
The number of relegated teams was also influenced by the location of teams which relegated from the second division. Each of the bottom placed second division teams could only relegate to the one 3. SNL group that was managed by the MNZ they were a part of.

3. SNL Centre

Clubs

League table

3. SNL East

Clubs

League table

3. SNL North

Clubs

League table

3. SNL West

Clubs

League table

See also

2016–17 Slovenian PrvaLiga
2016–17 Slovenian Second League

External links
Football Association of Slovenia 
MNZ Ljubljana 
MNZ Lendava 
MNZ Celje 
MNZ Koper

References

3
Slovenian Third League, 2016-17
Slovenian Third League seasons